Perry Township is one of nine townships in Lawrence County, Indiana, United States. As of the 2010 census, its population was 2,259 and it contained 943 housing units.

History
Perry Township was established in 1822. It was named for Commodore Oliver Hazard Perry.

Geography

Unincorporated towns
 Popcorn at 
 Red Hill at 
 Springville at 
(This list is based on USGS data and may include former settlements.)

Cemeteries
The township contains these fourteen cemeteries: Baptist, Byers-Rainbolt (aka Beyers-Rainbolt), Christian, Cobb, East, Graves, Gray, Lowder, Oak Grove, Quaker, Short, Slave, Springville West (aka Methodist) and Preston.

Major highways
  Indiana State Road 54
  Indiana State Road 58

Demographics

School districts
 North Lawrence Community Schools
 Springville Community Academy - a public charter school opened in 2022 serving Grades K - 8.  It is authorized by the University of Southern Indiana

Political districts
 Indiana's 4th congressional district
 State House District 65
 State Senate District 44

References
 
 United States Census Bureau 2008 TIGER/Line Shapefiles
 IndianaMap

External links
 Indiana Township Association
 United Township Association of Indiana
 City-Data.com page for Perry Township

Townships in Lawrence County, Indiana
Townships in Indiana